The 2010 Winton V8 Supercar Event was the sixth race meeting of the 2010 V8 Supercar Championship Series. It contained Races 11 and 12 of the series and was held on the weekend of May 15–16 at Winton Motor Raceway, near Benalla, in rural Victoria.

James Courtney backed up his double win at Queensland Raceway with another double victory, moving into the lead of the championship for the first time in his V8 Supercar career.


Results
Results as follows:

Qualifying Race 11
Qualifying timesheets:

Race 11
Race timesheets:

Qualifying Race 12
Qualifying timesheets:

Race 12
Race 12 was cut short by three laps as the telecast run over.

Race timesheets:

Standings
After race 12 of 26

Source

References

External links
Official timing and results

Winton
May 2010 sports events in Australia